In mathematics, the incomplete Fermi–Dirac integral for an index j is given by

This is an alternate definition of the incomplete polylogarithm.

See also 
 Complete Fermi–Dirac integral

External links
 GNU Scientific Library - Reference Manual

Special functions